The 2010 FC Rubin Kazan season was the club's 8th season in  the Russian Premier League, the highest tier of football in Russia. Rubin where the reigning Premier League champions having won the title the previous two seasons. Rubin finished the season in 3rd place, qualifying for the Third qualifying round of the 2011–12 UEFA Champions League, whilst they were also knocked out of the 2010–11 Russian Cup at the Round of 32 stage by Volgar-Gazprom Astrakhan.
In Europe, Rubin advanced to the 2010–11 UEFA Europa League Round of 32 having finished third in their 2010–11 UEFA Champions League group, behind Barcelona and Copenhagen but ahead of Panathinaikos

Squad

Out on loan

Transfers

In

Loans in

Out

Loans out

Released

Competitions

UEFA Europa League

Knockout phase

Russian Super Cup

Russian Premier League

Results by round

Results

League table

Russian Cup

UEFA Champions League

Group stage

Squad statistics

Appearances and goals

|-
|colspan="14"|Players away from the club on loan:

|-
|colspan="14"|Players who left Rubin Kazan during the season:

|}

Goal scorers

Disciplinary record

References

2010
Rubin Kazan
Rubin Kazan